2,3-Dihydrothiepine is a partially saturated analog of thiepine.

References

Thiepines